Shiu in Iran may refer to:
 Shiu, Gilan
 Shiu, Hormozgan